"Me and You" was the first solo single by the Italian singer Alexia, released in 1995. It featured guest vocals from Double You and reached number 1 on the Italian charts. The song was initially released in Italy on CD and 12" (coded DWA 01.73), with releases in other European countries following. The German edition would be released by ZYX, the Spanish release by Blanco Y Negro and the French release by Panic, a subsidiary of Polygram. A remix 12" was later released. In 1996, the track was released in America on Popular Records.

Critical reception
AllMusic editor Tom Demalon described the song as "galloping high-energy track with a Euro-disco flavor". Billboard complimented "her smoky voice and her flexibility over the track's rubber band-like bassline and galloping beat" in their review of the song.

Official versions 
Radio Edit 4:04
Extended Euromix 6:45
Voltage Mix 5:43
Acappella 4:04
Groove Remix 5:37
Ice Fran Remix 6:10
Denny's Abyss Remix 7:001

1On a US promotional 12" of "Number One"

Chart performance

References 

1995 songs
1995 debut singles
Alexia (Italian singer) songs
Songs written by Roberto Zanetti
Songs written by Alexia (Italian singer)
Number-one singles in Italy
Number-one singles in Spain